Alberto Thieroldt (born 4 January, 1966 in Lima), is a sociologist renowned children's literature writer. He has a Bachelor's degree in Sociology, Bachelor's degree in Education and a Master's degree in Children's and Youth Literature. He is also a universities educator. He has been a jury in many Literature contests and constantly teaches writing workshops.

Biography 

Alberto Thieroldt was born on January 4, 1966, in Lima, Peru. He discovered his love for writing and reading when he was already a teenager. In many interviews, he tells that, during his studies at school, he was not a star student (outstanding), in fact, he was very naughty. And, for that reason, many of the teachers considered he did not have much of a future. This is why Alberto criticizes the rapid pigeonholing that is given to young people, calling them lazy or people without much future, simply for acting according to their age or their desire to live life at that time. He believes that the most outstanding students in school do not always achieve their dreams in adulthood, despite the fact that everyone thinks they do.
Alberto was an outstanding student in sports and in literature... in none other. And although he no longer plays soccer, he is still a dedicated runner, always a lover of sports and physical activity.

Personal life 
He has been happily married since 1999 and currently has two daughters. One already an adult and the last one, pubescent.
Despite the fact that Alberto's roots and ancestry are German, he is proud to be Peruvian.

Books 
Juicio en el zoológico. Bogotá: Norma, 2004.

Los caras pintadas. Bogotá: Norma, 2007.

Valentino y la mentira de Duque. Lima: Norma, 2008.

La oleada. Lima: Norma, 2010.¿Quién es el más importante?. Lima: Norma, 2011.Mundo cereza. Lima: Ed. Planeta, 2014.Mi papá se ha perdido. Lima: SM, 2018.A paso de Limeña. Lima: Ed. Panamericana, 2018.Corazón de madera''. Lima: Norma, 2019.

References

External links 
 Anuario iberoamericano sobre el libro infantil y juvenil. Madrid: Fundación SM, 2012.
 Alberto Thieroldt: “La esencia del arte es el juego”
 Registros de libros publicados por Alberto Thieroldt
 ATV+ | Sin Copia Entrevistas: Alberto Thieroldt - "Mi papá se ha perdido"
 “Mi papá se ha perdido” es el libro infantil escrito por padre e hija
 Entrevista Alberto Thieroldt

Peruvian people of German descent
Peruvian sociologists
Living people
1966 births